Jean-Luc Moudenc (born 19 July 1960) is a French politician serving as Mayor of Toulouse since 2014, previously holding the office from 2004 to 2008. A member of The Republicans, he was defeated for reelection in 2008 by Pierre Cohen, candidate of the Socialist Party. He defeated Cohen in a rematch in 2014.

Biography

Career
Born in Toulouse, Moudenc graduated from Toulouse 1 University Capitole in 1984. He worked as a journalist before entering local politics. He became a municipal councillor in 1987, before entering the Regional Council of Midi-Pyrénées in 1992, where he stayed until 2004. He also was General Councillor of Haute-Garonne from 1994 to 2008 for the canton of Toulouse-9.

After the elevation of Mayor Philippe Douste-Blazy to the position Minister of Health, an interim officeholder was appointed in the person of Françoise de Veyrinas. Moudenc succeeded her as Mayor of Toulouse. He was defeated in the 2008 municipal election but retook the position in the 2014 municipal election; he has also been President of Toulouse Métropole since 24 April 2014. From 2012 to 2014, he served as the member of the National Assembly for the third constituency of Haute-Garonne. In that capacity, he succeeded Pierre Cohen, who did not file a candidacy. Moudenc is standing for reelection in the 2020 municipal election with the support of Les Républicains and La République En Marche! (REM).

Personal life
Moudenc is married and has two children.

See also
 List of mayors of Toulouse
 2012 French legislative election

External links

 Official bio
 Moudenc's blog 

1960 births
Living people
Mayors of Toulouse
Politicians from Occitania (administrative region)
Union for French Democracy politicians
Union for a Popular Movement politicians
The Republicans (France) politicians
Toulouse 1 University Capitole alumni
Deputies of the 14th National Assembly of the French Fifth Republic